Chukovo may refer to the following places in Bulgaria:

Chukovo, Gabrovo Province
Chukovo, Kardzhali Province